Stoneburg is an unincorporated community in Montague County, Texas, United States. It had a population of approximately 51 in 1990.

History
Stoneburg sits at the intersection of U.S. Route 81 and Farm to Market Road 1806 in east central Montague County. The town developed after the construction of the Chicago, Rock Island, and Texas Railway between Fort Worth, Texas and Salina, Kansas in 1893. The town's proximity to Bowie, however, limited the prospect of major growth and the population never surpassed 150. Its post office, opened in 1893, closed in 1954.

Education
The Gold-Burg Independent School District serves area students.  It is a consolidated school district created by merging the Ringgold school district and the Stoneburg school district.  Elementary age students attend school at Ringgold, while middle and high school students attend Gold-Burg High School at Stoneburg.

Destruction
On April 9, 2009, Stoneburg was evacuated due to wildfires, and subsequently was destroyed by fire. This evacuation describes the community as a ghost town. The Texas Forest Service described it as "burned over."

References

External links
 

Unincorporated communities in Texas
Unincorporated communities in Montague County, Texas